George Levi Russell III (born September 4, 1965) is a United States district judge of the United States District Court for the District of Maryland.

Biography

George Levi Russell III was born in Baltimore, Maryland. He received his Bachelor of Arts degree from Morehouse College in 1988. He received his Juris Doctor from the University of Maryland School of Law in 1991. He served as a law clerk for Judge Robert M. Bell of the Maryland Court of Appeals from 1991 to 1992. He worked at Hazel & Thomas PC from 1992 to 1994. He served as an Assistant United States Attorney from 1994 to 1999 handling civil matters. He worked at the law firm of Peter G. Angelos, PC from 2000 to 2002. He again served as an Assistant United States Attorney from 2002 to 2007 handling criminal cases. He was appointed as an associate judge of the Circuit Court of Maryland in Baltimore where he served from 2007 until 2012.

Federal judicial service

On November 10, 2011, President Barack Obama nominated Russell to be a District Judge on the United States District Court for the District of Maryland. He would replace Judge Peter J. Messitte, who assumed senior status in 2008. He received his hearing by the Senate Judiciary Committee on January 26, 2012 and his nomination was reported to the floor on February 16, 2012 by voice vote, with Senator Mike Lee recording the only no vote. On May 14, 2012, the Senate confirmed his nomination by voice vote. He received his commission on May 22, 2012.

See also 
 List of African-American federal judges
 List of African-American jurists

References

External links

1965 births
African-American judges
Assistant United States Attorneys
Judges of the United States District Court for the District of Maryland
Living people
Maryland state court judges
Morehouse College alumni
United States district court judges appointed by Barack Obama
21st-century American judges
University of Maryland Francis King Carey School of Law alumni